Jalila Hafsia (born 1927) is a Tunisian writer. Born in Colonial Tunisia, published one of the first Tunisian novels written in French.

Biography 
Hafsia was born in Sousse in 1927. After receiving her education she worked for several cultural institutions, eventually serving as director of the Tahar Haddad Cultural Club, a prominent cultural club often associated with women writers. In 1975 she published Ash at Dawn, one of the novels by a Tunisian woman to be written in French.

She was an admirer of Simone de Beauvoir, with whom she corresponded. In 2019 she was named a Grand Officer of the Tunisian Order of the Republic for her cultural achievements.

References 

1927 births
Tunisian novelists
Tunisian journalists
People from Sousse
Living people
Tunisian writers in French